Yansaré is a town in the Saponé Department of Bazèga Province in central Burkina Faso. The town has a population of 1,048.

References

Populated places in the Centre-Sud Region
Bazèga Province